Bonefish Pond National Park is a national park in New Providence, the Bahamas.

Flora and fauna
The park provides an important nursery for crawfish and conch. Prior to 2013, due to inappropriate waste disposal, an area of the park contained no fish. This wetland was restored with the planting of red mangroves, encouraging population by fish species including snapper, damselfish, needlefish, barracuda and bonefish.

References

National parks of the Bahamas
New Providence